Treadmill Ridge is located on the border of Alberta and British Columbia.It is Alberta's 98th most prominence mountain. It was named in 1923 by Arthur O. Wheele he believed that the mountain resembled a treadmill.

See also
 List of peaks on the Alberta–British Columbia border
 Mountains of Alberta
 Mountains of British Columbia

References

Treadmill Ridge
Treadmill Ridge
Canadian Rockies